Alex Nicholson may refer to:

 Alex Nicholson (ice hockey) (1923–2009), Canadian ice hockey goaltender
 Alex Nicholson (Welsh footballer) (born 1994), Welsh footballer
 Alex Nicholson (Australian footballer) (1897–1972), Australian rules footballer
 Alex Nicholson (fighter) (born 1990), American mixed martial artist

See also
 Alexander Nicholson (disambiguation)